Enkelejd Alibeaj (born September 11, 1973) is a member of the Albanian parliament. He was the minister of justice in Albania from 2005–2009. He is a member of the Democratic Party of Albania.

Career in politics 
In the years 2005-2007, Alibeaj served as the Director of the Department of Internal Administrative Control and Anticorruption at the Council of Ministers. The appointment in this position is the direct competence of the Prime Minister and the department he led constitutes an important and efficient structure of the administrative investigation of the activity of the state administration, having concrete results and appreciated by the internal opinion and international organizations. During these years he has represented the Council of Ministers in court cases before the Constitutional Court.

Alibeaj was engaged in academic activities as a lecturer in the subject "Constitutional Law" at several universities and has contributed to a number of activities and academic publications in the field of law.

Alibeaj had participated in a number of seminars, conferences, activities and training courses abroad related to criminal procedural law (Italy, Poland), human rights (Strasbourg), judicial reform (Bulgaria) or in the field of anti-corruption.

In the years 2000-2003, he served as the executive director of a non-profit organization in the field of law "Institute of Democratic Studies" with the object of his activity being studies in the field of law and preparation of legislation. He has also been engaged by the OSCE - Presence in Albania as one of the best local experts in the field of election systems and legislation.

From 2005-2009 Alibeaj served as minister of Justice in the Berisha I Government.

Dispute with Berisha (2022–) 
Following the resignation of Lulzim Basha from the results of On 11 December 2021 at Arena Kombëtar where 4,446 voted for the removal of Lulzim Basha from party leader of the Democratic Party. Up until 21 March 2022 where he had resigned. Bashas faction ultimately gave Alibeaj leadership roles. There has been a wide spread rumor that Basha is controlling what Alibeaj does specfically orders what he should do using Alibeaj as merely as a puppet. However, the leadership roles where disputed by De facto leader Sali Berisha and his faction of the party where they claim that Berisha is the leader of the Democratic party. Alibeaj and Berisha both continue to argue over who is the leader of the Party. Which has caused the split at a worse time in which who will carry the party name in the upcoming local elections whether it being Berisha or Alibeaj. Commissioner of the Central Election Commission gave a controversial statement. Where he stated that it would be better off that neither factions registered. Alibeaj has stated he will have his own candidates in the local election as well as Berisha.  Which has made it unclear who will be the official candidates for the Democratic party of Albania. On 3 March 2023 during a controversial Trial In Tirana he became the leader of the Democratic Party of Albania. However, at the Same time Sali Berisha was holding a large scale of protests in Tirana.

References

Living people
Justice ministers of Albania
1973 births
Democratic Party of Albania politicians
Members of the Parliament of Albania
Place of birth missing (living people)
21st-century Albanian politicians